Camille Vasquez (born July 6, 1984) is an American attorney known for representing actor Johnny Depp in the defamation case that he brought against his ex-wife Amber Heard.

Early life and education
Vasquez was born in San Francisco, California, to a Colombian father and a Cuban mother. While attending the University of Southern California, she was the a member of Kappa Kappa Gamma and Gamma Sigma Alpha, and Order of Omega, in addition to be admitted into the  Skull and Dagger honor society during her senior year. She graduated magna cum laude from USC in 2006 with a Bachelor of Arts degree in communication and political science. She received her Juris Doctor from Southwestern Law School in 2010.

Career
Vasquez's legal career has focused on litigation and arbitration, particularly in the representation of plaintiffs in defamation litigation. In 2018, she joined the international law firm Brown Rudnick as an associate, practicing in its Southern California office. Vasquez represented Johnny Depp in cases against his former attorney and business manager and then in his defamation suit against his ex-wife Amber Heard. She will also represent Depp in a personal injury lawsuit filed by a film crew member who claims to have been physically assaulted by Depp in April 2017. Other clients she has represented include Ben Affleck, Leonardo DiCaprio, and Jennifer Lopez. 

She received particular public attention for her representation of Depp in the Depp v. Heard trial. The trial was livestreamed, receiving widespread viewership around the world. As a result, Google Trends noted a significant surge in searches of her name, and a hashtag of her name received over 980 million impressions on the video-sharing platform TikTok. Vogue called her an "overnight celebrity" as a consequence of the trial. Following the trial, Vasquez was promoted from associate to partner at her firm, Brown Rudnick.

In October 2022, Vasquez was part of a team at Brown Rudnick hired by Kanye West to provide legal counsel on his business interests. However, following West's refusal to retract his anti-Semitic remarks, the collaboration was dissolved.

In January 2023, she was hired by NBC News as a legal analyst.

References

External link 
 Camille M. Vasquez at Brown Rudnick

1984 births
Living people
University of Southern California alumni
Lawyers from San Francisco
Southwestern Law School alumni
American people of Cuban descent
American people of Colombian descent
Hispanic and Latino American lawyers
21st-century American women lawyers
21st-century American lawyers